"Life of Brian" is the sixth episode of the twelfth season and the 216th overall episode of the animated comedy series Family Guy. It aired on Fox in the United States and Canada on November 24, 2013, and is written by Alex Carter and directed by Joseph Lee.

The episode revolves around the death of Brian Griffin, after being struck by a car, and the family coping with the loss by adopting a replacement dog, Vinny.

Plot
Brian and Stewie flee a band of hostile Native Americans in a Jeep. Brian explains that on a trip to Jamestown in the past, Stewie gave the Native Americans guns which were used to wipe out the Europeans, leaving the Native Americans in charge of America. Stewie finds his return pad destroyed by bullets and decides to find the alternate timeline Stewie for help. Going to the equivalent of their house, they find a new time machine and pad then return to Jamestown to set things right. As soon as their original counterparts leave, they take back the guns and return to the proper time.

Tired of their close calls, Stewie destroys his time machine and crushes the remains at the junkyard. While there, Stewie and Brian find a street hockey net and take it home for exercise. The first time they set it up, Brian is hit and critically injured by an out-of-control driver. At the vet, the Griffins learn that Brian's injuries are too overwhelming to overcome, and the family says their goodbyes. Just before he dies, Brian expresses his love for the family, thanking them for the wonderful life they gave him.

Back home, while picking up the broken pieces of the hockey net, Stewie blames himself and the time machine for Brian's death. Stewie tries to rebuild the time machine and use it to save Brian, but finds that his dealer is unable to supply him with needed parts due to his connection being killed for unknowingly drawing Muhammad. The family and friends hold a funeral for Brian where Peter gives a tear-jerking eulogy, which  Quagmire is unfazed by. As Brian's casket is lowered into his grave, Stewie throws a final red rose onto the casket and he and the Griffin family watch on tearfully.

A month later, the Griffin family still misses Brian dearly and Lois decides the best way for them to recover is to get a new dog. Peter chooses an Italian smooth-talking dog named Vinny at the pet shop. At home, Vinny offers to make dinner and ingratiates himself with the family. At the Drunken Clam, Peter introduces Vinny to Joe and Quagmire and they become drinking buddies. Stewie is still not happy with Vinny and decides to ruin him. Stewie feeds him some sad Italian news hoping to break his heart, but Chris ruins it for Stewie. Later, Vinny hears Stewie crying and finds he is still upset over Brian. Vinny offers some comfort, talking about the death of his previous owner Leo, and proving he knows what it is like to lose a best friend. Vinny says even in the pet shop, he felt a kinship with the Griffin family. Stewie finally accepts Vinny into the family. Later that night, Vinny goes to sleep beside Stewie's bed.

Production

In November 2013, Family Guy writer Steve Callaghan told E! about why they decided to kill off Brian in the episode, saying: "Well, this was an idea that got pitched in the writers room and it sort of caught fire, and we thought it could be a fun way to shake things up. As soon as this idea came up, we started talking about what the next couple episodes could be and we got very excited about the way this change will affect the family dynamics and the characters."<ref name="eonline1">{{cite web | url=http://www.eonline.com/news/484172/family-guy-s-shocking-death-boss-reveals-why-they-decided-to-kill-off-spoiler | title=Family Guy'''s Shocking Death: Boss Reveals Why They Decided to Kill Off [Spoiler]! |work=E! | date=2013-11-24 | accessdate=2013-11-25 | author=Aguilera, Leanne}}</ref> He also explained why they decided to kill off Brian and not one of the other characters, saying: "It seemed more in the realm of a reality that a dog would get hit by a car than if one of the kids died. As much as we love Brian, and as much as everyone loves their pets, we felt it would be more traumatic to lose one of the kids, rather than the family pet."

He also discussed how the other Family Guy actors reacted when they heard Brian would be killed in the episode, saying: "I think they were glad it wasn't them. [Laughs.] I think they were surprised, as anyone would be and I think they were pretty stunned especially this far into the show. They were as shocked as anyone." He also explained why they decided to replace Brian with another dog, saying: "It felt like the way that this show was conceived by Seth all those years ago, was this entire family unit including the parents, kids and a dog. So by losing Brian, it felt like a void needed to be filled both comically, and also for the interpersonal relationships between all the characters. We felt that we needed to fill that role."

He went on to explain why they decided to get Tony Sirico to voice Vinny saying: "I think it was Seth's idea actually to get Tony to come in. He's a big fan of The Sopranos and always loved Tony Sirico in particular and he thought it would be fun to write a character based around his voice and his personality and just who he is as an actor." He went on to discuss if he was worried about the backlash from Family Guy fans, saying: "I'm not, only because our fans are smart enough and have been loyal to our show for long enough, to know that they can trust us. We always make choices that always work to the greatest benefit of the series."

In January 2014, Seth MacFarlane spoke about how he was surprised by the fan reaction after Brian was killed off, saying: "It surprised all of us. We were all very surprised, in a good way, that people still cared enough about that character to be that angry. We thought it would create a little bit of a stir, but the rage wasn’t something we counted on."

Reception
Eric Thurm of The A.V. Club awarded the episode an A−, saying that Brian's death scene was "actually pretty poignant, coming as close as Family Guy can to genuinely moving", and said it was "surprisingly effective [...] at dealing with the sudden death of a main character".

Within hours of the episode's air on November 24, 2013, a petition for the resurrection of Brian Griffin directed towards series creator Seth MacFarlane and Fox Broadcasting Company emerged on Change.org. The petition reads "Brian Griffin was an important part of our viewing experience. He added a witty and sophisticated element to the show. Family Guy and Fox Broadcasting will lose viewers if Brian Griffin is not brought back to the show" and within hours of its launch had already gained thousands of signatures, making the petition one of the fastest-growing entertainment-related petitions on the site. The petition was started by Family Guy fan Aaron Thompson, who also started a Facebook page called "R.I.P. Brian Griffin From Family Guy" in an effort to get MacFarlane to bring back Brian with the episode Christmas Guy two episodes later.

The episode received a 2.2 out of 5 rating and was watched by a total of 4.58 million people. This made it the second most watched show on Animation Domination that night, beating American Dad! and Bob's Burgers but losing to The Simpsons'' with 6.78 million.

References

External links 
 

Family Guy (season 12) episodes
2013 American television episodes
Television episodes about funerals
Native Americans in popular culture
Television episodes about death